Capitocrassus castaneus is a species of beetle in the family Cerambycidae, and the only species in the genus Capitocrassus. It was described by Van Eecke in 1921.

References

Petrognathini
Beetles described in 1921